Bicyclus dekeyseri, the western scalloped bush brown, is a butterfly in the family Nymphalidae. It is found in Guinea, Liberia, Ivory Coast and Ghana. The habitat consists of deep forests.

References

Elymniini
Butterflies described in 1958